"Balance of Terror" is the fourteenth episode of the first season of the American science fiction television series Star Trek. Written by Paul Schneider and directed by Vincent McEveety, it first aired on December 15, 1966, and again aired on August 3, 1967. 

In the episode, the USS Enterprise battles a Romulan ship after investigating an unidentified assailant who methodically destroys the Federation's outposts at the Neutral Zone.

"Balance of Terror" introduces the cloaking device and the Romulans. Mark Lenard plays the Romulan commander; he later portrayed Spock's father Sarek in the majority of his later Star Trek appearances, as well as a Klingon captain in Star Trek: The Motion Picture. The episode also features the final appearance of yeoman Janice Rand (Grace Lee Whitney), who would not appear again until Star Trek: The Motion Picture.

The episode's events are explored within an alternate future in the Star Trek: Strange New Worlds (2022) episode "A Quality of Mercy".

Plot
The USS Enterprise, under the command of Captain Kirk, is investigating a loss of communications with a line of Earth outposts near the Romulan Neutral Zone, formed under the terms of the peace treaty that ended the Earth–Romulan War a century earlier. Because there were no visual communications at that time, the two races have never seen each other.

While Kirk officiates at the wedding of Lieutenant Tomlinson and Ensign Martine, Outpost 4 comes under attack. The Enterprise comes to Outpost 4's aid and contacts the base commander, Hansen, who reveals he is the only survivor of an attack by an unknown enemy. As they speak, the enemy ship reappears, fires, and disappears. The shot destroys the outpost and kills Hansen.

The ship's sensors locate the attacker, which remains invisible. Kirk surmises that the attacker is equipped with a cloaking device. A coded message from the intruder provides a view through one of its internal cameras, revealing humanoids with an appearance like Vulcans. Lieutenant Stiles, the navigator, son of a service family that lost several members in the Earth–Romulan War, begins to question the loyalty of the Enterprise first officer, Mr. Spock.

During a discussion of the Romulan ship's capabilities, Stiles suggests the Enterprise attack before it can reach the Neutral Zone. Spock agrees; he reasons that if the Romulans are in fact an offshoot of the Vulcan species and have retained the martial philosophy of the Vulcans' ancient past, they would surely take advantage of any perceived weakness.

A cat-and-mouse game ensues. The Enterprise is faster and more maneuverable, while the Romulan ship has a cloaking device and immensely destructive plasma torpedoes. However, the range of these torpedoes is limited, and firing one requires so much power that the ship must decloak first.

After several attacks, the Romulans, almost beaten, plant a nuclear weapon amidst jettisoned debris. When Spock detects a "metal-cased object", Kirk orders a point-blank phaser shot that detonates the device. The Enterprise is shaken by the blast and many of the phaser crew are incapacitated, requiring Stiles to fill in. Kirk orders operations to work at minimal power to exaggerate the apparent damage and lure the Romulans in for a kill shot. Although the Romulan commander suspects Kirk's trap, Decius, a politically well-connected member of the command crew, pressures him to attack. When the Romulan ship decloaks to launch a torpedo, Kirk tries to spring his trap, but a coolant leak in the phaser control room incapacitates Stiles and Tomlinson. Spock, whom Stiles had called "Vulcan" and insulted as being unneeded in the control room, returns to rescue Stiles and fires the phasers, mortally wounding the Romulan ship.

Kirk hails the Romulans and at last communicates directly with his opponent, offering to beam aboard survivors. The Romulan commander tells Kirk that he regrets having met him in combat, that "You and I are of a kind. In a different reality, I could have called you friend." He declines Kirk's offer to take off his crew, telling the Captain that it is not the Romulan way to be taken prisoner. The Commander then triggers his ship's self-destruct system.

Enterprise only fatality is Lt. Tomlinson. Kirk goes to the chapel to offer comfort to a grieving Ensign Martine.

Production
The Star Trek Compendium stated the episode was essentially a science fiction version of the submarine film The Enemy Below, depicting a cat-and-mouse game between the Enterprise as the American destroyer against a Romulan vessel as the U-boat.
Director Vincent McEveety had seen the 1957 film The Enemy Below but only noticed the similarities between its plot and this episode later. He admitted "Obviously, it's the same story."

The soundtrack cue "In the Chapel", played during the opening scene of the wedding ceremony, is an instrumental medley of the 19th century English song "Long, Long Ago" by Thomas Haynes Bayly and the "Bridal Chorus" by Richard Wagner.

The term photon torpedo  was only invented for a later episode "Arena", but the same effect was used in this one although still called phaser.

On September 16, 2006, "Balance of Terror" became the first digitally remastered Star Trek episode, featuring enhanced and new visual effects, computer generated (CGI) spaceships, and high definition format.

All core Star Trek regular background players appear in this episode: Eddie Paskey (Lt. Lesley and William Shatner stand-in), Frank da Vinci (Lt. Brent and Leonard Nimoy stand-in), William Blackburn (Lt. Hadley and De Forest Kelley stand-in), Ron Veto (Harrison), John Arndt (Fields), and Jeanne Malone (Enterprise yeoman and stand-in for Grace Lee Whitney.)

Reception
The episode is frequently praised by critics and regularly appears on lists of the best episodes of Star Trek. In 2016, The Washington Post ranked "Balance of Terror" the third-best episode of the entire Star Trek franchise, noting that it investigates the connection between wars and race, that it shows both sides of a conflict in deep space. A 2017 article in The Washington Post which ranked the seven captains of Star Trek included a special mention of the captain of the Romulan vessel, calling him "The greatest alien captain".
In 2016, Business Insider ranked "Balance of Terror" the best episode of The Original Series. In 2016, SyFy ranked guest star Mark Lenard (the Romulan captain), as the eighth-best guest star on The Original Series. In 2016, Empire ranked this the 43rd-best in a top 50 ranking of the 700 plus Star Trek television episodes. Critic Ed Gross praised the episode for exploring the theme of bigotry, and as "a piece of television that manages to conjure genuine suspense as one commander attempts to outmaneuvre the other".

Legacy
Guest star Mark Lenard, who portrayed the Romulan commander, returned in the episode "Journey to Babel" where he played Sarek, Spock's father. Lenard has the distinction of having played a Romulan, Klingon and Vulcan over the course of the series, the only actor to have done so.

Bryan Fuller called the episode a "favorite" and a "touchstone" which influenced the creation of the story arc in Star Trek: Discovery.

The events of the episode are revisited in the Star Trek: Strange New Worlds episode "A Quality of Mercy", where Christopher Pike (Anson Mount) sees an alternative future wherein he was not disabled and has retained captaincy of the USS Enterprise. The differences between Pike and Kirk are highlighted; while Pike's preference for peace and mutual respect eventually gain the admiration of the Romulan commander, the peaceful attempt to negotiate with the Romulans, who see the gesture as an act of weakness and determine that the Federation is likewise weak, caused restarting open war with the Romulans, and it is ultimately alternate-future Kirk's brashness, cunning, and luck that barely saved the alternative Enterprise; his quality is implied to be what prevented open war with Romulans in the original timeline.

Non-canon works
Comic book publisher IDW Publishing released a prequel, Star Trek Alien Spotlight: Romulans and a sequel, Star Trek Romulans: The Hollow Crown.  They are not part of the official Star Trek canon.

References

External links

 

 "Balance of Terror" Revised Script July 19–22, 1966; report and analysis by Dave Eversole

Star Trek: The Original Series (season 1) episodes
1966 American television episodes
Television episodes directed by Vincent McEveety
Television episodes written by Paul Schneider (writer)